Willoughby Williams was an American war veteran and politician from North Carolina.

Early life
Williams was born in the 18th century.

Career
Williams enlisted in 1776 and fought in the American Revolutionary War as a regimental commissionary officer. He served in the Battle of Cowpens of January 17, 1781. In 1790, he was elected to the North Carolina House of Representatives.

Personal life
On January 1, 1786, Williams married Nancy Glasgow (1771-1857), daughter of James Glasgow (1735-1819) who served as North Carolina Secretary of State from 1777 to 1798. They had six children. Their son Willoughby Williams Jr. (1798-1882) went on to live in Woodlawn, a National Register of Historic Places-listed mansion in Nashville, with his wife m. Nancy Nichols (1808-1844).

Williams lived in Dobbs County, North Carolina.

Death
Williams died on June 6, 1802 in Rutledge, Tennessee on his way to Davidson County, Tennessee. In 1806, his widow married Joseph McMinn, who served as Governor of Tennessee from 1815 to 1821.

References

18th-century births
1802 deaths
People from Dobbs County, North Carolina
Continental Army officers from North Carolina
Members of the North Carolina House of Representatives